Nancy Y. Lee is a Taiwanese-born American physician and the vice-chair of the Department of Radiation Oncology in Memorial Sloan Kettering's Department of Medicine.

Biography 
Lee was born in Taiwan and received her bachelor's degree from Barnard College, where she majored in chemistry. She earned her medical degree at the University of Medicine and Dentistry of New Jersey, and completed her residency in Radiation Oncology at the Columbia Presbyterian Medical Center.

Lee has two sons and her husband is an academic ENT surgeon.

Career 
Lee specializes in using intensity-modulated radiation therapy (IMRT) to treat thyroid and head and neck cancers. She served as the principal investigator for the Radiation Therapy Oncology Group (RTOG) in a national trial to refine the use of IMRT for treating nasopharyngeal cancer. She is also a member of the RTOG's Head and Neck Cancer Working Group.

Lee was a co-author of the Cancer Immunotherapy Guidelines for Head and Neck Cancer put forward by the Society for Immunotherapy of Cancer. She sits on the editorial board of the Journal of Radiation Oncology. She is also the series editor of the Practical Guides in Radiation Oncology. In 2017 the American Society for Radiation Oncology designated her as a fellow.

Significant publications 
 Beckham TH, Romesser PB, Groen AH, Sabol C, Shaha AR, Sabra M, Brinkman T, Spielsinger D, McBride S, Tsai CJ, Riaz N, Tuttle RM, Fagin JA, Sherman EJ, Wong RJ, Lee NY. Intensity-Modulated Radiation Therapy With or Without Concurrent Chemotherapy in Nonanaplastic Thyroid Cancer with Unresectable or Gross Residual Disease. Thyroid. 2018 Sep;28(9):1180-1189. doi: 10.1089/thy.2018.0214. PMID: 30105947; PMCID: PMC6154443.
Romesser PB, Cahlon O, Scher ED, Hug EB, Sine K, DeSelm C, Fox JL, Mah D, Garg MK, Han-Chih Chang J, Lee NY. Proton Beam Reirradiation for Recurrent Head and Neck Cancer: Multi-institutional Report on Feasibility and Early Outcomes. Int J Radiat Oncol Biol Phys. 2016 May 1;95(1):386-395. doi: 10.1016/j.ijrobp.2016.02.036. Epub 2016 Feb 17. PMID: 27084656; PMCID: PMC4997784.
Lee NY, Zhang Q, Pfister DG, Kim J, Garden AS, Mechalakos J, Hu K, Le QT, Colevas AD, Glisson BS, Chan AT, Ang KK. Addition of bevacizumab to standard chemoradiation for locoregionally advanced nasopharyngeal carcinoma (RTOG 0615): a phase 2 multi-institutional trial. Lancet Oncol. 2012 Feb;13(2):172-80. doi: 10.1016/S1470-2045(11)70303-5. Epub 2011 Dec 15. PMID: 22178121; PMCID: PMC4985181.
Riaz N, Hong JC, Sherman EJ, Morris L, Fury M, Ganly I, Wang TJ, Shi W, Wolden SL, Jackson A, Wong RJ, Zhang Z, Rao SD, Lee NY. A nomogram to predict loco-regional control after re-irradiation for head and neck cancer. Radiother Oncol. 2014 Jun;111(3):382-7. doi: 10.1016/j.radonc.2014.06.003. Epub 2014 Jun 30. PMID: 24993329; PMCID: PMC5125394.
de Arruda FF, Puri DR, Zhung J, Narayana A, Wolden S, Hunt M, Stambuk H, Pfister D, Kraus D, Shaha A, Shah J, Lee NY. Intensity-modulated radiation therapy for the treatment of oropharyngeal carcinoma: the Memorial Sloan-Kettering Cancer Center experience. Int J Radiat Oncol Biol Phys. 2006 Feb 1;64(2):363-73. doi: 10.1016/j.ijrobp.2005.03.006. Epub 2005 May 31. PMID: 15925451.

References

External links 
Lee's profile at Memorial Sloan Kettering Cancer Center

Living people
American radiologists
Year of birth missing (living people)
Taiwanese radiologists
Barnard College alumni
University of Medicine and Dentistry of New Jersey alumni
Women radiologists
Taiwanese women physicians
21st-century American women physicians
21st-century American physicians
Taiwanese emigrants to the United States